Václav Budka (born 22 March 1969) is a retired Czech football midfielder.

References

1969 births
Living people
Czech footballers
AC Sparta Prague players
K.S.C. Lokeren Oost-Vlaanderen players
FK Jablonec players
FK Mladá Boleslav players
Association football midfielders
Belgian Pro League players
Czech First League players
Czech expatriate footballers
Expatriate footballers in Belgium
Czech expatriate sportspeople in Belgium